The Czech National Cyclo-cross Championships are held annually to decide the Czech cycling champions in the cyclo-cross discipline, across various categories.

Men

Women

See also
Czech National Road Race Championships
Czech National Time Trial Championships

References

Cycle races in the Czech Republic
Recurring sporting events established in 1993
1993 establishments in the Czech Republic
National cyclo-cross championships